Club Sport Uruguay de Coronado, also known as Uruguay de Coronado is a Costa Rican football club, that currently plays in the Costa Rican Segunda División.

History
Founded 3 January 1936, they were named after the first FIFA World Cup champions, Uruguay. They changed their first club colors, red and black like Alajuelense, to the yellow and black of Uruguayan giants Peñarol and made their Primera División debut in 1950. In 1961, they became runner-up to champions El Carmen, when the big clubs left the Federación Costarricense de Fútbol and founded their own ASOFUTBOL league and the title was contested between three clubs only: Carmen, Uruguay de Coronado and Gimnástica Española. However, the ASOFUTBOL teams returned to the league and only Uruguay retained their place in the top tier.

In 1963, they surprisingly won the league with players like "Caballo" Otárola, "Camarón" Padilla, Luis Chacón, Carlos Luis "Piche" García and Rodrigo "Riguín" Sandoval.

They played in the Primera División from 1988 until relegation in 1992. Uruguay returned to the top flight in summer 2012.

Stadium 

Club Sport Uruguay plays its home games at the El Labrador Municipal Stadium, which bears that name in honor of San Isidro Labrador, Patron Saint of the Cantón of Vázquez de Coronado.

The stadium is located about 250 meters south of the Church of San Isidro de Coronado (central district of the canton).  It has a capacity for 2,500 seated people (approximately);  its grass is synthetic with a striped design (it was the first with this design in Costa Rica) and has great drainage capacity.

It is municipal property and is under the administration of Club Sport Uruguay since 12/01/2014, thanks to a agreement signed between both parties.

On September 21, 2008, he said goodbye to his Natural Grass, to make way for a high-quality synthetic grass.  An eight-lane athletics track was also installed around the pitch and a gymnasium for club and public use.  It is currently receiving other works in its infrastructure and has plenty of space around where it is planned to place more bleachers to increase its capacity.

Honours

National
Primera División de Costa Rica: 1
 1963

Segunda División de Costa Rica: 5
 1949, 1960, 1967–68, 1986–87, Clausura 2011

Tercera División de Costa Rica: 1
 1940

Current squad
As of February 22, 2023

Championship 1963
List of players and coaching staff who won the Costa Rica First Division National Soccer Championship on November 3, 1963.

References

External links
 Official
 Cerocero
 Soccerway

Football clubs in Costa Rica
Association football clubs established in 1936
1936 establishments in Costa Rica